The Rock & Roll Hall of Fame 2020 Inductions was an American television special that premiered on HBO on November 7, 2020. The ceremony was initially planned for May 2020 but was postponed due to the COVID-19 pandemic. The class of inductees includes The Notorious B.I.G., The Doobie Brothers, Nine Inch Nails, T. Rex and Depeche Mode as well as Irving Azoff and Jon Landau who both received the Ahmet Ertegun Award for Lifetime Achievement.

Guest list

 Luke Bryan 
 Sean Combs
 Miley Cyrus 
 Billy Gibbons 
 Dave Grohl
 Don Henley
 Jennifer Hudson
 Billy Idol 
 Iggy Pop
 Alicia Keys
 Adam Levine
 Chris Martin
 Lin-Manuel Miranda 
 Brad Paisley
 Bruce Springsteen
 St. Vincent
 Ringo Starr
 Gwen Stefani
 Charlize Theron
 Nancy Wilson

References

External links
 

2020
2020 television specials
American television specials
HBO network specials
HBO Max original programming
November 2020 events in the United States
Events postponed due to the COVID-19 pandemic